Penz may refer to:

 Alain Penz  (born 1947), a French former alpine skier
 Claude Penz (born 1924), a French former alpine skier who competed in the 1948 Winter Olympics
 Markus Penz  (born 1975), an Austrian skeleton racer who has competed since 2002
 Peter Penz (born 1984), an Austrian luger who has competed since 2003

See also
 Penzing (disambiguation)